Iyseden Christie (born 14 November 1976 in Coventry) is an English footballer who plays for Coventry Sphinx, where he plays as a striker.

Playing career

Coventry City
Born in Coventry, West Midlands, Christie began his career as a trainee at Coventry City in 1995. He made his FA Premier League debut on 23 September 1995, appearing as a second-half substitute for Paul Cook in Coventry's 5–1 defeat away to Blackburn Rovers. He made one further appearance, in the League Cup before joining AFC Bournemouth on loan in November 1996, followed by a loan spell with Mansfield Town from February 1997.

Mansfield Town
He joined Mansfield Town on a free transfer in August 1997 and made over 90 league and cup appearances for Mansfield in two seasons. He joined Leyton Orient for a fee of £40,000 in July 1999, and made over 60 league and cup appearances for Orient in three seasons, before returning to Mansfield Town in August 2002. He made over 70 appearances in his second spell at Mansfield but was released by the club after defeat in the Third Division play-off Final in May 2004.

In 1997, he scored a four-minute hat-trick against Stockport County in a League Cup first-round tie. This remains the record for the fastest League Cup hat-trick.

Kidderminster Harriers
Christie signed for Kidderminster Harriers at the start of the 2004–05 season, but injury restricted him to just one start and a handful of substitute appearances that season.

Rochdale
In January 2006, after having scored 10 goals in 23 league games, he was sold to Rochdale along with teammate Mark Jackson for a joint £35,000 transfer fee. In August 2006, Christie returned to Kidderminster on loan until December.

Kidderminster Harriers
Following the completion of this loan spell Christie re-signed for Kidderminster on an 18-month contract in January 2007.

Stevenage Borough
He joined Stevenage Borough when his contract with Kidderminster expired at the end of June 2008. He made just three appearances for Stevenage, before joining fellow Conference National side Kettering Town on loan on 2 September 2008 until 17 January 2009. During this period he scored 6 goals in 15 games, including playing against Premier League side Fulham in the FA Cup. It was believed this loan spell was to be ended early for a loan move to York City to go ahead, but this deal fell through.

Torquay United
On 31 December 2008 it was announced that Christie was to make his loan deal at Kettering permanent on 1 January 2009, in a five-figure deal. However, on 2 February 2009 he left Stevenage to join Torquay United.

King's Lynn
He signed for non-League King's Lynn in August 2009 after a short period on trial with Hibernians in Malta, following termination of the loan agreement with Torquay at the end of the 2008–09 season.

A.F.C. Telford United
On 11 September 2009, Christie signed for Conference North side A.F.C. Telford United, but left after two games.

Farnborough
He played one game for his local team Coventry Sphinx, before making his debut for Farnborough as an 80th-minute substitute on 21 October.

Tamworth
On 13 November 2009, it was announced that Christie had joined Conference National side Tamworth on non-contract terms. On the same day he was joined by his former Kidderminster teammate Simon Brown, who joined the club on a one-month loan deal from Wrexham.

Kettering Town
After playing for Tamworth till the end of the 2009–10 season, he rejoined Kettering Town for their 2010–11 campaign.

Nuneaton Town
On 30 March 2011, Christie joined promotion chasing Conference North side Nuneaton Town until the end of the season. Christie's first game for the club was a 3–0 away win at Gloucester City. Justin Marsden's goal came from a superb bit of individual guile and skill to beat two defenders by Christie before squaring the ball to Marsden to slot home.

Tamworth
Following a successful trial, Christie returned to The Lambs.

Halesowen
In the second qualifying round of the 2014–15 FA Cup on 27 September 2014, Christie scored six times against Ellistown & Ibstock United as Halesowen Town advanced to the third qualifying round of the FA Cup with a 7–1 win.

Later career
Following at stint at Sutton Coldfield Town, Christie signed for Southern Football League side Bedworth United in January 2016.

On 19 August 2019, 44-year old Christie returned to Coventry Sphinx.

References

External links

1976 births
Living people
Footballers from Coventry
English footballers
Association football forwards
Coventry City F.C. players
AFC Bournemouth players
Mansfield Town F.C. players
Leyton Orient F.C. players
Kidderminster Harriers F.C. players
Rochdale A.F.C. players
Stevenage F.C. players
Kettering Town F.C. players
Torquay United F.C. players
King's Lynn F.C. players
AFC Telford United players
Coventry Sphinx F.C. players
Farnborough F.C. players
Tamworth F.C. players
Nuneaton Borough F.C. players
Alfreton Town F.C. players
Barwell F.C. players
Halesowen Town F.C. players
Sutton Coldfield Town F.C. players
Bedworth United F.C. players
Premier League players
English Football League players
National League (English football) players
Northern Football League players
Southern Football League players